Anthony Arthur (born  in Manchester) is a retired British male weightlifter, competing in the 85 kg category and representing Great Britain and England at international competitions.

Weightlifting career
He participated at the 1996 Summer Olympics in the 83 kg event. He competed at world championships, most recently at the 2001 World Weightlifting Championships. He represented England at the 1998 Commonwealth Games in Kuala Lumpur, Malaysia, where he won a bronze medal in the 94 kg snatch category. Four years later he competed at the 2002 Commonwealth Games in the 85 kg division and won two silver medals in the combined and snatch and a bronze medal in the clean and jerk.

Major results

References

External links
 

1973 births
Living people
English male weightlifters
Weightlifters at the 1996 Summer Olympics
Olympic weightlifters of Great Britain
Sportspeople from Manchester
Weightlifters at the 1994 Commonwealth Games
Weightlifters at the 1998 Commonwealth Games
Weightlifters at the 2002 Commonwealth Games
Commonwealth Games medallists in weightlifting
Commonwealth Games silver medallists for England
Commonwealth Games bronze medallists for England
Medallists at the 1998 Commonwealth Games
Medallists at the 2002 Commonwealth Games